"With a Little Help from My Friends" is a song by the Beatles. 

With a Little Help from My Friends may also refer to:

 With a Little Help from My Friends (Joe Cocker album), 1969
 With a Little Help from My Friends (Lu Elliott album), 1968
 With a Little Help from My Friends (Neal Morse album), 2007
 With a Little Help from My Friends, an album by Larry Carlton, 1969
 With a Little Help from My Friends, an album by Steve Cropper, 1969
 With a Little Help from My Friends, an album by Toto, 2021
 With a Little Help from My Friends, a 1993 book by Beatles producer George Martin with William Pearson

See also
 With a Little Help from My Fwends, a 2014 album by the Flaming Lips